Lee Academy can refer to more than one educational institution in the United States:

 Lee Academy (Arkansas), based in Marianna, Lee County, Arkansas.
 Lee Academy (Maine), based in Lee, Maine.
 Lee Academy (Mississippi), based in Clarksdale, Mississippi.
 Robert E. Lee Academy, based in Bishopville, South Carolina.